Siyavashan (also Romanized as Sīyāvashān, Seyāvashān, Sīāvashān, and Sīāvoshān; also known as Sheoshān and Sīāh Vashān) is a village in Siyavashan Rural District, in the Central District of Ashtian County, Markazi Province, Iran. At the 2006 census, its population was 826, in 285 families.

References 

Populated places in Ashtian County